The Walpole Express is a junior, youth, and girls hockey organization based in Walpole, Massachusetts. They have had more than 70 commitments since 2017, and that includes multiple division 1 college committees. The teams play their home games at the Rodman Arena, located just 2 miles from Gillette Stadium. As of 2022 they have changed their name to Express Hockey Club

Junior teams

Most notably, the Express field teams in the Tier III junior Eastern Hockey League (EHL) (formerly the Atlantic Junior Hockey League) and the EHL's Premier Division.

The EHL team is coached by Josh Holmstrom. The EHL teams was previously coached by former professional player and Huntsville Havoc captain Jon Lounsbury, Olympian and NHL alumni Mark Kumpel, and Cody Campbell who moved on to coach the North American Hockey League's Minot Minotauros.

The Express AJHL team captured three consecutive President's Cup Championships (2010, 2011, and 2012), the AJHL Regular Season Championship two of those years (2011 and 2012), and the 2010 AJHL North Division Championship. The now EHL-19U Elite team (formerly in the Metropolitan Junior Hockey League until 2015) has also won the 2009 MJHL Regular Season Championship and 2011 MJHL Francis Division Championship under general manager and coach Tony Dalessio.

Season-by-season records

Youth teams
The Express field numerous half and full-season youth teams ranging from U14 through U18. The program is led by Ottawa Senators Scout, Todd Stirling.

Alumni
The Walpole Express have produced a number of alumni playing in higher levels of, NCAA Division I, Division III college and professional programs.

References

External links
 Official Walpole Express Website
 Eastern Hockey League

2005 establishments in Massachusetts
Ice hockey clubs established in 2005
Ice hockey teams in Massachusetts
Walpole, Massachusetts
Sports in Norfolk County, Massachusetts
Junior ice hockey teams in the United States